Susana Ferrari Billinghurst (1914–1999) was an Argentine aviator of Italian, English, and Irish descent. She was the first woman in South America to earn a commercial pilot's license, in 1937.

Career
In 1937, Billinghurst became the first woman in South America to earn a commercial pilot's license. In 1940, she piloted an amphibious Sikorsky S-43 in a 4,000-mile trip from Panama to Argentina.

During the 1943 Revolution Day in Argentina, she entered the presidential house with a symbolic bouquet, getting from the new president a historical engagement in favour of women's rights, particularly in the aviation field.

In November 1943, she made a flight to Uruguay with two other aviators (Elida Carles and Julia Perez Cattoni), officially representing the Argentine government.

Family
Billinghurst was the great-granddaughter of Mariano Billinghurst, for whom the city of Billinghurst, Argentina, is named; niece of Argentine aviator Lisandro Billinghurst, and first cousin twice removed of Guillermo Billinghurst, who was the president of Peru. Susana was the grandmother of actress Luciana Pedraza, the wife of actor Robert Duvall.

Bibliography
Vitry, Roberto. Mujeres Salteñas: Susana Ferrari Billinghurst. Editorial Hanne, año 2000.

References

External links
 Artículo Star Pulse 19/6/2006- "Hollywood legend Robert Duvall discovers he married into a family of great Argentinean aviators".  
 Artículo Clarin 5/7/2007- "Pioneras de la aviación argentina". 

1914 births
1999 deaths
People from Buenos Aires
Argentine aviators
Women aviators
Argentine people of German descent
Argentine people of English descent
Argentine women aviators